The Chinese Ambassador to Turkey is the official representative of the People's Republic of China to the Republic of Turkey.

List of envoys of the Republic of China

List of ambassadors of the Republic of China

List of ambassadors of the People's Republic of China

See also 

China–Turkey relations
List of ambassadors of Turkey to China
Embassy of China, Ankara

References 

 
Turkey
China